The Pará Falls (Salto Pará) are large waterfalls on the Caura River in Bolívar, Venezuela.

Due to the difficulty of portaging past the falls, they are a traditional boundary for the Ye'kuana and Kalina tribes.

French naturalist Eugène André was the first European to describe the falls, on his 1900 exploration of the Caura River. In an article for The Geographical Journal he wrote:

In 1976 the state owned power company CADAFE studied the Pará falls as a potential site for a hydroelectric plant. These plans were later dropped due to unsuitable geology.

As there are no roads in the area, the falls are most easily reached by boat.

See also
List of waterfalls by flow rate

References

External links
Aerial view of Pará Falls, Gobierno Bolivariano de Venezuela, 2017

Landforms of Bolívar (state)
Tourist attractions in Bolívar (state)
Waterfalls of Venezuela